The 2012 Florida A&M Rattlers football team represented Florida A&M University as a member of the Mid-Eastern Athletic Conference (MEAC) in the 2012 NCAA Division I FCS football season. The Rattlers were led by fifth year head coach Joe Taylor and played their home games at Bragg Memorial Stadium. They finished the season 4–7 overall and 4–4 in MEAC play to tie for sixth place.

Schedule

References

Florida AandM
Florida A&M Rattlers football seasons
Florida AandM Rattlers football